Arizona Methodist Church is a historic church located along Arizona Road (LA 806), about  south of its junction with LA 2.

Also known as Arizona United Methodist Church, it was built in about 1880 and added to the National Register in 1983.

As of 1983, it was "the only surviving historic landmark of the Arizona community, which during the postbellum period was a thriving town with a substantial cotton mill and academy."

See also
National Register of Historic Places listings in Claiborne Parish, Louisiana

References

United Methodist churches in Louisiana
Churches on the National Register of Historic Places in Louisiana
Greek Revival church buildings in Louisiana
Churches completed in 1880
Buildings and structures in Claiborne Parish, Louisiana
National Register of Historic Places in Claiborne Parish, Louisiana